The Oberhausen Manifesto was a declaration by a group of 26 young German filmmakers at the International Short Film Festival Oberhausen, North Rhine-Westphalia on 28 February 1962. The manifesto was a call to arms to establish a "new German feature film". It was initiated by Haro Senft and among the signatories were the directors Alexander Kluge and Edgar Reitz. The manifesto was associated with the motto "Papas Kino ist tot" (Papa's cinema is dead), although this phrase does not appear in the manifesto itself.

The signatories to the manifesto became known as the Oberhausen Group and are seen as important forerunners of the New German Cinema that began later in the decade. Their names are: 
 Bodo Blüthner
 Boris von Borresholm
 Christian Doermer
 Bernhard Dörries
 Heinz Furchner
 Rob Houwer
 Ferdinand Khittl
 Alexander Kluge
 Pitt Koch
 Walter Krüttner
 Dieter Lemmel
 Hans Loeper
 Ronald Martini
 Hansjürgen Pohland
 Raimund Ruehl
 Edgar Reitz
 Peter Schamoni
 Detten Schleiermacher
 Fritz Schwennicke
 Haro Senft
 Franz-Josef Spieker
 Hans Rolf Strobel
 Heinz Tichawsky
 Wolfgang Urchs
 Herbert Vesely
 Wolf Wirth

The Oberhausen Group were awarded the Deutscher Filmpreis in 1982.

External links
Text of the Manifesto (English translation)
Text of the Manifesto (German language)
Interview with Peter Berling

Cinema of Germany
Oberhausen
20th century in North Rhine-Westphalia
1962 in Germany
1962 in film
1962 documents